Ringkøbing Håndbold (Ringkøbing Handball) is a Danish handball club from Ringkøbing. In the season 2022/23 it plays in the Danish Women's Handball League.

Kits

Stadium 
Name: Green Sports Arena
City: Ringkøbing
Capacity: 1,100 persons
Address: Kirkevej 26, Rindum, Ringkøbing

Team

Current squad 
Squad for the 2022–23 season 

Goalkeepers
 1  Elín Þorsteinsdóttir
 12  Linnéa Björkman
 16  Marit Huiberts
Wingers
LW
 19  Rikke Jochumsen
 25  Sascha Juul (Pregnant)
RW
 22  Sofie Østergaard
Line players
 3  Alberte Simonsen 
 5  Caroline Svarre
 23  Nanna Hinnerfeldt Andersen

Back players
LB
 13  Rikke Jensen 
 77  Leonora Demaj
CB
 15  Jane Mejlvang
 27  Marigona Hajdari
RB
 8  Julie Holm
 33  Emma Laursen

Transfers
Transfers for the 2023-24 season

Joining
  Cecilie Bjerre (LB) (from  Lugi HF)

Leaving
  Rikke Jensen (LB)
  Julie Holm (RB) (to  Viborg HK)
  Alberte Simonsen (P) (to  Viborg HK)

Notable players 

 Mia Biltoft
 Sofie Blichert-Toft
 Daniella Dragojevic
 Mathilde Neesgaard
 Julie Gantzel Pedersen
 Anne Sofie Hjort
 Anne Mette Pedersen
 Camilla Maibom
 Julie Aagaard
 Amanda Brogaard
 Malene Dalgaard
 Louise Gundesbøl Sørensen
 Henriette Holm
 Hanne Trangeled Nielsen
 Kirstine Kjeldgaard
 Miriam Juul
 Maria Ipsen
 Katrine Thomsen
 Liza Olsen
 Betina Kjær
 Henriette Holm
 Mille Hundahl
 Julie Kjær Larsen
 Michaela Ek
 Linnéa Claeson
 Emma Friberg
 Sara Nirvander
 Martina Adamsson Jensen
 Ane Eidem
 Simona Hajduk
 Jaqueline Anastácio
 Caroline Müller
 Željka Nikolić

References

External links 
 Official homepage 

Danish handball clubs
Handball clubs established in 2007
2007 establishments in Denmark